Lau Cheuk Hin (born 26 April 1992 in Hong Kong) is a former Hong Kong professional footballer who played as a midfielder.

Youth career
In January 2011, while playing amateur football for Sham Shui Po, through the Nike The Chance programme, Lau won a place along with 3 other young Chinese footballers in Shanghai, China to fly to the United Kingdom and compete among the 100 players from all over the world, for the 8 available places to train there. In addition to playing for Sham Shui Po, Lau also represented Beacon College's football team, along with 4 other club mates.

Club career
On 14 January 2012, Lau helped Sham Shui Po to a 1–0 win over Hong Kong Sapling in the 2011–12 Hong Kong League Cup first round match. Hong Kong national team coach Ernie Merrick praised his outstanding performance. At the year-end HKFA Award Ceremony, Lau  was named the Best Young Player of 2011–12 season. At that time, he was regarded as one of the most talented youth players in Hong Kong. Lau joined Yokohama FC Hong Kong during the summer of 2012.

On 27 June 2017, Lau signed with Rangers. However, he struggled with fitness issues and eventually left the club in January 2018.

International career
On 10 June 2012, Lau made his international debut in a friendly match against Vietnam.

Personal life
On 14 January 2012, after the victory over Hong Kong Sapling, Lau gave his father a T-shirt written with the words Father, Happy Birthday, I love you as his father's 52nd birthday present.

Career statistics

International
As of 10 June 2012

References

External links 
https://www.hkfa.com/en/club/10/detail?player=8413 Lau Cheuk Hin] at HKFA

1992 births
Living people
Hong Kong footballers
Hong Kong international footballers
Hong Kong First Division League players
Hong Kong Premier League players
Sham Shui Po SA players
Association football forwards
Yokohama FC Hong Kong players
South China AA players
Hong Kong Rangers FC players